The 1936–37 season was Stoke City's 37th season in the Football League and the 23rd in the First Division.

After the club's best ever season last campaign Stoke struggled to live up to their previous success and finished the season in a mid-table position of 10th. However it was a to be a season of record making with three being set during the 1936–37 season. A record attendance of 51,373 made it into the Victoria Ground on 29 March to watch a 0–0 draw with Arsenal. However the most remarkable achievement was that of a 10–3 victory over Staffordshire rivals West Bromwich Albion and thirdly, Freddie Steele finished the season with 33 league goals.

Season review

League
During the summer of 1936 there was a change at boardroom level with Mr H. Booth replacing Mr A. Sherwin as chairman. After the club's best ever season in 1935–36 Stoke found it difficult in the 1936–37 season to improve and a disappointing 10th-place finish was the final outcome. Stoke were hampered by a poor away record with only three wins forthcoming during the season and an equal record of 15 wins and defeats a mid-table finish was the obvious outcome.

During the 1936–37 season Stoke made three new club records which all still stand. A record attendance of 51,373 made it into the Victoria Ground on 29 March to watch a 0–0 draw with Arsenal.  However the most remarkable achievement was that of a 10–3 victory over Staffordshire rivals West Bromwich Albion and thirdly, Freddie Steele finished the season with 33 league goals.

Record league victory
A 10–3 win over West Bromwich Albion is Stoke City's record League victory here is a summary of the match.

Stoke gave debuts to Scottish keeper Douglas Westland and full-back James Harbot. Stoke went into the match as narrow favourites but went on to outclass Albion in all positions. The first goal came after 10 minutes as Steele headed in a Stanley Matthews cross. Albion levelled just a minute later through Richardson following a fine move. Stoke re-took the lead through a copy of their first on 20 minutes as Albion struggled to contain Matthews. After 32 minutes Stoke went 3–1 up, Steele was brought down in the area by Bill Richardson and Arthur Turner scored from the spot. Four minutes before half-time Steele claimed his hat-trick. In the second half Stoke made it 5–1 through England winger Joe Johnson before Steele missed an open goal. Wally Boyes pulled one back to 5–2 however Steele got his fourth and fifth to make it 7–2 on 67 minutes. Richardson made it 7–3 before Johnson again and George Antonio got on the score sheet. With 15 minutes left the score line was 9–3 and with the crowd chanting for more it duly arrived when Antonio made it 10–3 to complete a historic result.

FA Cup
Stoke beat Birmingham 4–1 in the third round with Freddie Steele bagging a hat trick. However Stoke were on the end of a heavy defeat themselves in the next round as they lost 5–1 to eventual runners-up Preston North End.

Final league table

Results

Stoke's score comes first

Legend

Football League First Division

FA Cup

Squad statistics

References

Stoke City F.C. seasons
Stoke